Orlando Junior College was a private, segregated Junior College in Orlando, Florida, that served white Christians only.

Orlando Junior College opened in 1941 on the grounds of the former Magnolia School, explicitly excluding Black and Jewish students. In 1944 the school moved to a 20-acre site on Lake Highland. In 1957, the school was offered $1 million by a private corporation if they would allow Blacks and Jews; the board refused. In 1967, the founding of Valencia College and other public institutions challenged the continued viability of the school. As a result, the school was converted to a segregation academy for grades 1-11 (later adding 12th grade and kindergarten) and renamed Lake Highland Preparatory School.

References

1941 establishments in Florida
1971 disestablishments in Florida
Segregated schools in the United States
Segregation academies in Florida